Domaine Laroche is a family business winery in the Chablis AOC.
Grégory Viennois, a graduate of the University of Burgundy, is the winemaker. Chablis AOC  wines are produced exclusively from the Chardonnay grape. Domaine  Laroche decided to bottle its offering under screw caps to keep wines fresh and prevent cork taint, but later  switched back to using corks.

Wine criticism
Domaine Laroche Les Vaudevey Premier Cru Chablis 2015 was rated 93 points by Wine & Spirits.

Jeannie Cho Lee rated the 2013 Domaine Laroche Chablis at 80 points, calling it a "Simple Chablis without much depth."

See also
List of Chablis crus
Burgundy wine

References

French wine